Lalita Vakil is an Indian embroidery artist known for her contributions to the preservation and promotion of Chamba Rumal, a traditional form of handkerchief embroidery from Chamba district in Himachal Pradesh.

Vakil has been awarded Padma Shri in 2022 by the Government of India for her contributions in the field of arts. She was also awarded the Nari Shakti Puraskar in 2018.

Life 
Vakil was married at the age of fifteen. It was her father-in-law who recognized her talent in creating designs for Chamba Rumal. He motivated her further to train local girls and women in this craft.

Career 
Since the past fifty years, Vakil has been working for the promotion and preservation of Chamba Rumal. She has traveled extensively in India and abroad to exhibit her works and conduct workshops for this form of traditional embroidery.

Vakil has often experimented with the designs of the Chamba Rumal. She was the first woman to introduce silk in the embroidery to create larger pieces of the handkerchief. Moreover, she has also developed designs for saris, shawls, dupattas and stoles along with creation of multi-panel sets.

Awards 

 2009 - Shilp Guru
 2017 - Nari Shakti Puraskar
 2022 - Padma Shri

References 

Recipients of the Padma Shri in arts
Living people
Women artists from Himachal Pradesh
20th-century Indian women artists
21st-century Indian women artists
Indian textile artists
20th-century women textile artists
20th-century textile artists
Indian embroiderers
Year of birth missing (living people)